Elections to Kilmarnock and Loudoun District Council were held on 3 May 1984, on the same day as the other Scottish local government elections. This was the fourth election to the district council following the local government reforms in the 1970s.

The election was the first to use the 18 wards created by the Initial Statutory Reviews of Electoral Arrangements in 1981 – two more than the previous election. Each ward elected one councillor using first-past-the-post voting.

Labour maintained a large majority on the district council after winning 14 of the 18 seats, three more than the party had won at the previous election in 1980. Despite increasing their vote share by more than 10%, the Conservatives only won three seats, two fewer than four years previous. The final seat was won by the Scottish National Party (SNP).

Results

Source:

Ward results

Ward 1

Ward 2
Ward 1 was renamed Ward 2 following the Initial Statutory Reviews of Electoral Arrangements.

Ward 3

Ward 4

Ward 5

Ward 6

Ward 7

Ward 8

Ward 9

Ward 10

Ward 11

Ward 12

Ward 13

Ward 14
Ward 13 was renamed Ward 14 following the Initial Statutory Reviews of Electoral Arrangements.

Ward 15

Ward 16
Ward 14 was renamed Ward 16 following the Initial Statutory Reviews of Electoral Arrangements.

Ward 17
Ward 15 was renamed Ward 17 following the Initial Statutory Reviews of Electoral Arrangements.

Ward 18
Ward 16 was renamed Ward 18 following the Initial Statutory Reviews of Electoral Arrangements.

References

Kilmarnock
Kilmarnock and Loudoun District Council elections